Chiras  is a major village and valley in Sar-e Pol Province, in northern Afghanistan. It was formerly in Jowzjan Province. The village lies north of Jawak, west of Zabrak and southeast of Khami Deh. The people of Chiras are said to be Murghabi Tajiks.
The main occupation is agriculture, with most of the fertile lands lying to the west of the village and a narrow strip to the south.

In December 1883, Chiras was the subject of a confrontation between Maimana troops and Dilawar Khan. Khan was forced to abandon Chiras.

Climate
Chiras has a humid continental climate (Köppen: Dsb) with warm, dry summers and cold, snowy winters.

See also
 Sar-e Pol Province

References

Populated places in Sar-e Pol Province
Valleys of Afghanistan
Villages in Afghanistan
Landforms of Sar-e Pol Province